Lacul cu Nămol, also called (Lacul) Balta cu Nămol, is a natural salt lake in the town of Ocna Sibiului, Sibiu County, Transylvania, Romania. It is one of the many lakes of the Ocna Sibiului mine, a large salt mine which has one of the largest salt reserves in Romania.

Name 
In Romanian,  Lacul cu Nămol  means  the Lake with Mud . The other name of the lake, Balta cu Nămol, means the Pond with Mud.

History 
The lake formed in a depression created by salt excavation.

Information 
Lacul cu Nămol and Lacul Negru are the only lakes of the mine to have mud. Something else they have in common is that their depth is very small, probably reaching 1–2 m.

Lakes of the salt mine 
 Auster 
 Lake Avram Iancu-Ocniţa
 Balta cu Nămol 
 Brâncoveanu 
 Cloşca 
 Crişan
 Lacul Fără Fund 
 Gura Minei 
 Horea 
 Mâţelor 
 Negru
 Pânzelor 
 Rândunica 
 Verde (Freshwater lake)
 Vrăjitoarelor (Freshwater lake)

References 

Lakes of Sibiu County